Salman Shah (Urdu: سلمان شاہ) is a Pakistani economist who serves as Advisor to the Chief Minister of Punjab on Economic Affairs and Planning & Development. Previously, he has served as the caretaker Finance Minister of Pakistan. He has also served as an advisor to the Finance Minister Shaukat Aziz on finance, economic affairs, statistics and revenues. He is the son-in-law of former Chief of Army Staff General Asif Nawaz Janjua. He has two sons and three daughters.

References

External links
 Educational background of state ministers
 A profile of Salman Shah

Year of birth missing (living people)
Living people
Pakistani economists
Finance Ministers of Pakistan
Kelley School of Business alumni
Politicians from Lahore
Punjabi people
Academic staff of Lahore University of Management Sciences
Pakistani financiers
Ross School of Business faculty
St. Anthony's High School, Lahore alumni